Youth against Racism in Europe (YRE) is an anti-racist organisation founded by the Committee for a Workers' International (the international network of the Militant tendency) it campaigns among young people in 16 countries in Europe. YRE was launched by an international demonstration of 40,000 people against racism, in Brussels in October 1992.

It was a wave of racist attacks in Germany and the success of the Blokbuster Belgian youth movement, opposing the far-right Vlaams Blok, which convinced the Committee for a Workers' International, to work to launch an international youth organization along the same lines.

In 1994, YRE organised an anti-racist camp in Germany of 1,500 young people from all over Europe.

The charity Show Racism the Red Card, founded by Ged Grebby, was inspired by his work and involvement with YRE, particularly the concept of educational packs for schools.

Britain

In the UK, YRE was launched in 1992, at a time of rising racist violence and electoral support for the far right. YRE was formed by Militant Labour as an alternative to the rival Socialist Workers Party (UK)'s Anti-Nazi League (ANL), relaunched the previous year, and the Socialist Action-dominated Anti-Racist Alliance, also launched in 1991.

In Britain, YRE's activity has focused around opposition to the British National Party. In 1987 the BNP moved its headquarters to Welling, in south east London.  In the next six years there were four racially motivated murders in south-east London, including that of Stephen Lawrence in April 1993. The following month, on a demonstration called by YRE and others, including Panther, the black socialist organisation, over 8,000 people marched past the BNP headquarters in protest at the murders and the far-right party's presence in the area. Subsequent larger demonstrations were called, co-organised by YRE, numbering 60,000 and 50,000 respectively. A demonstration in October that year met with heavy police presence, leading to violent clashes between police and protesters.

In 2010, the group was at the centre of controversy over undercover policing in Britain, following revelations that YRE had been infiltrated by the Metropolitan Police and accusations that the police sought to discredit the anti-racism movement through the use of agent provocateur tactics.

France

YRE launched in France in 1993, with a month-long speaking tour by one of the founders of Panther UK. The speaking tour took place against the background of the recently released Malcolm X film and drew parallels between the US civil rights struggles and the continuing need for black youth to continue to organise today. YRE gained considerable popularity amongst French youth through notable campaigns in defence of immigrants without working papers and the rights of girls wearing the hijab in Mantes-la-Jolie. YRE's participation in an anti-deportation campaign whose goal was to mobilize the passengers of flights departing from Roissy-Charles-de-Gaulle airport against deportations, earned the organisation the ire of the Minister of the Interior of the time, Jean-Pierre Chevènement.

Greece

The Greek YRE has organised demonstrations with immigrants in support of immigrant workers' rights, as well as campaigning for the provision of facilities for Gypsies in the country.

In recent years, it has worked to oppose the extreme right-wing Golden Dawn, which won its first municipal council seat in 2010 and entered parliament for the first time in 2012.  This has included calling for the shutting down of the organisation and its weekly newspaper on the grounds that "they propagate violent messages of hate".

References

External links
 
International Socialist Alternative website

Anti-racist organizations in Europe
Committee for a Workers' International